Ponorogo Regency is a regency (kabupaten) of East Java, Indonesia. It is considered the birthplace of Reog Ponorogo, a traditional Indonesian dance form.

Geography 
Ponorogo Regency is located in the southwestern part of the province of East Java on the border with Central Java province.

History
According to the Babad Ponorogo history, Ponorogo was founded when Bathoro Katong conquered the Wengker region. This region had previously been controlled by Suryo Ngalam Wengker. Bathoro Katong originally settled in modern-day Pekalongan in what is now the village Setono in district Jenangan. Though faced with many obstacles, Raden Katong, Aji Selo, and Ki Ageng Mirah and his family continued to establish settlements in the region.

With the consent of all parties, Bathoro Katong established the Duchy Ponorogo on 11 August 1496. This date is celebrated as the founding of Ponorogo, and is corroborated by ancient objects, such as a pair of stone gilang located in front of the fifth gate of the Katong Batara tomb complex. The gilang contains the forms of a human meditating, trees, eagle and elephants (candrasengkala gilang memet); all of which combine to represent the Saka year 1496.

Economy
Ponorogo Regency is one of fastest growing regency in East Java. To improve irrigation and economy, a new "Bendo Dam" was built and officially opened at September 2021.

Administrative districts 
The regency is divided into twenty-one districts (kecamatan), tabulated below with their areas and their population at the 2010 census and 2020 census, together with the official estimates as at mid 2021. The table also includes the number of administrative villages (rural desa and urban kelurahan) in each district and its postal codes.

Culture 
Ponorogo town, generally considered the birthplace of Reog, is also known by the names City (of) Reog and City (of) Rasta. Each year in the Islamic month of Muharram, Ponorogo holds a celebration known as Grebeg Suro, "the party of the people". Grebeg Suro involves many traditional events such as the National Reog Festival, the Heritage Carnival and the Larungan Proceedings of Prayer held at Lake Ngebel.

On 11 August, the anniversary of the founding of the Ponorogo Regency is celebrated. The day markes 11 August 1496, when Bathara Katong, the first leader of Ponorogo, went from the Old Town to the Central City of Ponorogo and crowned himself the first Duke of Ponorogo.

Ponorogo is also known for its culinary specialties such as Sate Ponorogo — grilled marinated chicken – served in peanut sauce, garnished with shredded shallots, chilli paste and lime juice.

Education 

Educational institutions in Ponorogo range from pre-school and kindergarten to university.

Pre-school and kindergarten facilities are mainly provided private or religious institutions and are available in almost every village. Elementary schools are run by public and private institutions. There is at least one public elementary school in every village and some villages have more than one public elementary school.

There are a number of both junior and senior high schools in Ponorogo. High schools exist in every sub-district. In addition to senior high schools, students can study at vocational high schools. Ponorogo also has several universities which are mostly run by private or religious institutions. There are three public universities, Akademi Komunitas Negeri Ponorogo, Akademi Keperawatan Pemkab Ponorogo, and IAIN Ponorogo. There are also many Islamic boarding schools, including the Pondok Modern Darussalam Gontor located in the village of Gontor in the Mlarak District.

Sport and recreation 
Telaga (lake) Ngebel covers approximately 150 hectares, and is popular for jet skiing and other water sports. The lake is roughly a one-hour drive (about 30 kilometers) from Ponorogo or Madiun.

Recognition
In the Otonomy Awards 2011, Ponorogo Regency received the Grand Award of Public Service Innovation.

Climate 
Ponorogo has 65–95% of humidity. The maximum humidity is 95% and the average humidity is 80%.

References

External links